Taylor River may refer to:

Taylor River (Colorado), United States
Taylor River (New Hampshire), United States
Taylor River, New Zealand
Taylor River (Washington), United States
Taylor River (British Columbia), Canada